Golam Shabbir Sattar is a Bangladeshi academic. He is the current vice-chancellor of Rajshahi University.  Sabbir Sattar is the director of the Institute of Environmental Science. He was also the Student Adviser of the university during 2009 to 2012.

References 

Vice-Chancellors of the University of Rajshahi
Academic staff of the University of Rajshahi
Living people
Year of birth missing (living people)